Diana Peñalver (born 1965) is a Spanish actress known for starring in Braindead (1992), Year of Enlightment (1986) and El Lute: Run for Your Life (1987). She also starred in the Spanish television series Las chicas de hoy en día.

References

External links

Living people
1965 births
20th-century Spanish actresses